Caramella is a 2010 studio album by the Italian singer Mina.

Caramella may also refer to:
 Caramella, a fictional character in the Italian comedy film Scandal in Sorrento, played by Tina Pica
 Candy Caramella, a fictional character in the French animated series Space Goofs
 Count Caramella (it. , ru. Граф Карамелла), an opera by Baldassare Galuppi
 Doto caramella, a species of gastropod within the genus Doto

People with the surname
 Alberto Caramella (1928–2007), an Italian poet and lawyer
 Riccardo Caramella, Italian pianist, the first Western pianist to perform Xian Xinghai's Yellow River Concerto in China with a Chinese orchestra

See also
 Caramella Girls, a Swedish musical group
 Miriam Caramella Josephine Battista (1912–1980), an American actress known for her early career as a child star in silent films
 Carmella, a given name
 Ciaramella, surname